The diocesan governor of kristiansand was a government agency of the Kingdom of Norway.

The  (diocesan county) of Stavanger was established in 1662 by the King. It was originally made up of three subordinate counties: Stavanger amt, Bratsberg amt, and Agdesiden amt. In 1671, Agdesiden was divided into two new counties: Lister og Mandal amt and Nedenæs amt. Stavanger stiftamt was led by a stiftamtmann and the subordinate counties were led by an amtmann. The stiftamtmann oversaw the subordinate counties and was the Kings representative there. The seat of the stiftamt and diocese originally was the city of Stavanger. In 1682, the seat of the stiftamt was moved from Stavanger to Christianssand, a much more centralized location. When this change occurred, the name of the stiftamt was changed to Christianssand stiftamt. In 1877, the spelling of the name was changed to Kristianssand stiftamt to reflect one of the Norwegian language reforms. Then again in 1889, the spelling was changed to Kristiansand stiftamt. In 1919, there was a large county reorganization in Norway and every stiftamt was abolished and the counties were renamed .

List of diocesan governors 
The following is a list of the governors of the Kristiansand stiftamt.

References

Kristiansand stift